Tomás Manso (died 1659) was a Roman Catholic prelate who served as Bishop of Nicaragua (1658–1659).

Biography
Tomás Manso was born in Avarca, Spain and professed as a member of the Order of Friars Minor on 12 July 1624. On 14 December 1656, he was selected by the king of Spain and confirmed on 29 April 1658 by Pope Alexander VII as Bishop of Nicaragua. He served as Bishop of Nicaragua until his death in 1659.

References

External links and additional sources
 (for Chronology of Bishops) 
 (for Chronology of Bishops) 

17th-century Roman Catholic bishops in Nicaragua
Bishops appointed by Pope Alexander VII
1659 deaths
Franciscan bishops
Roman Catholic bishops of León in Nicaragua